is a Japanese international rugby union player who plays as a Prop.

References

1990 births
Living people
People from Mitaka, Tokyo
Japanese rugby union players
Japan international rugby union players
Rugby union props
Tokyo Sungoliath players
Sunwolves players
21st-century Japanese people